Valkyria may refer to:
 A misspelling of valkyrie, or valkyrja, a supernatural female figure in Norse mythology

Valkyria (roller coaster), a roller coaster at Liseberg, Gothenburg, Sweden
Valkyria Chronicles, a series of tactical role-playing video games
Valkyria Chronicles (video game), the first game in the series
"Valkyria", song by Amon Amarth

See also 
 Valkyrie (disambiguation)